Fajar Alfian (born 7 March 1995) is an Indonesian badminton player affiliated with the SGS PLN Bandung. He won the men's doubles silver medal at the 2018 Asian Games, the bronze medals at the 2019 World Championships and at the 2017 Southeast Asian Games. Alfian was part of Indonesia winning team at the 2020 Thomas Cup.

Career 
Alfian started his partnership with Muhammad Rian Ardianto in July 2014. In the beginning of their career, they have won international tournaments including the Indonesia International in 2014, 2015, and 2016; the Austrian International in 2015; and at the BWF Grand Prix level, the 2016 Chinese Taipei Masters.

Alfian was a member of the Indonesia men's team that won gold medals at the 2017 and 2019 Southeast Asian Games. He also played with Ardianto, and clinched the men's doubles bronze at that event in 2017. Alfian and Ardianto competed on the BWF World Tour, and won titles at the 2018 Malaysia Masters and the Syed Modi International; and also the 2019 Swiss and Korea Opens. Together with Ardianto he won a bronze medal in the men's doubles at the 2017 Southeast Asian Games, the silver at the 2018 Asian Games, and another bronze at the 2019 BWF World Championships.

In February 2020, Alfian alongside Indonesia men's team won the Asia Team Championships held in Manila. In September–October 2021, Alfian alongside Indonesia team competed at the 2021 Sudirman Cup in Vantaa, Finland. He and Ardianto contribute a point in a tie against Canada. Indonesia team advanced to the knockout stage, but lost in the quarter-finals to Malaysia. In the next tournament, he helped Indonesia team won the World Men's Team Championships, the 2020 Thomas Cup.

Alfian and Ardianto kicked off 2022 with a rough start, with early exits at the German Open and the All England. They scored their breakthrough win at the Swiss Open. Afterwards, they won the Indonesia Masters, and Malaysia Masters, and finished as runner-up at Korea Open, Thailand Open, Malaysia Open and Singapore Open. They also won bronze medal at the Asian Championships. In October, they won their fourth title of the year at the Denmark Open in a tight battle against compatriots Marcus Fernaldi Gideon and Kevin Sanjaya Sukamuljo. Thanks to their achievements, they qualified for their first ever World Tour Finals. Alfian and Ardianto competed at the World Tour Finals as the first seed, but lost to Mohammad Ahsan and Hendra Setiawan at the semifinals. They closed off the 2022 World Tour season with a career high rank of world number 1.

2023 
In January,  Alfian and Ardianto  won their first Super 1000 tournament at the Malaysia Open by defeating Chinese pair Liang Weikeng and Wang Chang. The week after, they bowed out of India Open at the semifinals against Malaysians Aaron Chia and Soh Wooi Yik, leaving Indonesia without any representatives in any finals. At their home tournament Indonesia Masters, they lost in the quarter-finals against fifth seeds Liu Yuchen and Ou Xuanyi.

In February, Alfian was called up to the Indonesian team for the Badminton Asia Mixed Team Championships. He and Ardianto lost at the quarterfinals against Korean scratch pair Kim Won-ho and Na Sung-seung  

With the Indonesian federation skipping the German Open, Alfian resumed competition at the All England in March. He and Ardianto won their first ever All England title in an all-Indonesian final against Mohammad Ahsan and Hendra Setiawan.

Awards and nominations

Achievements

BWF World Championships 
Men's doubles

Asian Games 
Men's doubles

Asian Championships 
Men's doubles

Southeast Asian Games 
Men's doubles

BWF World Tour (10 titles, 5 runners-up) 
The BWF World Tour, which was announced on 19 March 2017 and implemented in 2018, is a series of elite badminton tournaments sanctioned by the Badminton World Federation (BWF). The BWF World Tour is divided into levels of World Tour Finals, Super 1000, Super 750, Super 500, Super 300, and the BWF Tour Super 100.

Men's doubles

BWF Grand Prix (1 title, 2 runners-up) 
The BWF Grand Prix had two levels, the Grand Prix and Grand Prix Gold. It was a series of badminton tournaments sanctioned by the Badminton World Federation (BWF) and played between 2007 and 2017.

Men's doubles

  BWF Grand Prix Gold tournament
  BWF Grand Prix tournament

BWF International Challenge/Series (4 titles) 
Men's doubles

  BWF International Challenge tournament
  BWF International Series tournament

Performance timeline

National team 
 Junior level

 Senior level

Individual competitions

Junior level

Boys' doubles

Mixed doubles

Senior level

Men's doubles

Mixed doubles

Record against selected opponents 
Men's doubles results with Muhammad Rian Ardianto against year-end Finals finalists, World Championships semi-finalists, and Olympic quarter-finalists. Accurate as of 11 December 2022.

References 

1996 births
Living people
Sportspeople from Bandung
Indonesian male badminton players
Badminton players at the 2018 Asian Games
Asian Games silver medalists for Indonesia
Asian Games medalists in badminton
Medalists at the 2018 Asian Games
Competitors at the 2017 Southeast Asian Games
Competitors at the 2019 Southeast Asian Games
Southeast Asian Games gold medalists for Indonesia
Southeast Asian Games bronze medalists for Indonesia
Southeast Asian Games medalists in badminton
21st-century Indonesian people